Shramkivka is an rural locality (a settlement) in Zolotonosha Raion of Cherkasy Oblast, Ukraine. Until 2017, it was an urban-type settlement. It hosts the administration of Shramkivka rural hromada, one of the hromadas of Ukraine. Population:

History 
Modern Shramkivka was formed on the basis of four ancient cossack little villages - khutors: Shramkivka, Polubotkivka, Shelykhovka and Ivanivka. 

According to one of versions here in 1660 at khutor Polubotivka was born Ukrainian hetman Pavlo Polubotok).

Until 18 July 2020,Shramkivka belonged to Drabiv Raion. The raion was abolished in July 2020 as part of the administrative reform of Ukraine, which reduced the number of raions of Cherkasy Oblast to four. The area of Drabiv Raion was merged into Zolotonosha Raion.

References

Rural settlements in Cherkasy Oblast